Porfirio DiDonna (1942–1986) was a 20th century American artist based in New York City.

Life
Porfirio DiDonna was born on 11 April 1942 in Brooklyn, New York, the son of Frank and Mary DiDonna. He had an older brother and sister, Salvatore and Joanne, and a younger sister, Catherine. He died in Brooklyn on 26 August 1986 at the age of 44.

Work

DiDonna  went to Alexander Hamilton Technical  High School in Brooklyn and  attended Brooklyn College for one semester.  In 1961 he enrolled in the Pratt Institute, also in Brooklyn, and graduated in 1964.  From 1966 to 1968 he pursued his graduate degree in fine arts at Columbia University.

Among his early influences were Matisse, Mondrain, and Kandinsky, as well as Raphael and  early Italian Renaissance artists such as Fra Angelico. He called his early paintings “religious” and they often were on religious themes, such as crucifixions and the stations of the cross.

By 1970 he was starting to work with the minimal marks that would come to characterize his painting and in late 1971 he “chose to limit himself to only dots, dashes, or straight lines loosely aligned in a horizontal and vertical formation. The restrictions resulted in a flexible grid, a form that would wholly absorb him for nearly a decade.”

The critic, Barry Schwabsky, in an essay for a 1994 exhibition catalog wrote that reviewers of DiDonna's work in the 1970s naturally mentioned Agnes Martin as an influence, as well as Brice Marden and the early dot paintings of Larry Poons.

He made a trip to Italy in 1980 and to Mexico in 1981 where he admired the Mayan and Aztec sites. By this time DiDonna had moved away from linear grids of lines and dots and began to experiment with “asymmetry and welcomed unexpected light.” An hour-glass shape started to become an important structural element in his paintings.

DiDonna’s work is in numerous public collections and in 2013 a major retrospective was exhibited at the Danforth Museum in Framingham, Massachusetts.

Public collections
 Jewett Arts Center, Wellesley College, Wellesley, Massachusetts
 Museum of Contemporary Art, Chicago, Illinois
 Museum of Fine Arts, Boston, Massachusetts
 Museum of Fine Arts, Houston, Texas
 Minnesota Museum of American Art, Saint Paul, Minnesota
 The Phillips Collection, Washington, D.C.
 Portland Art Museum, Portland, Oregon
 Rose Art Museum, Brandeis University, Waltham, Massachusetts
 Berkeley Art Museum, Berkeley, California

References

 Baker, John (2013). Porfirio DiDonna: The Shape of Knowing.  Brooklyn, NY: Pressed Wafer. 
 Baker, John (1997). Porfirio DiDonna: Evolution of the Minimal mark 1970 – 1980. Boston: Nielsen Gallery. LCCN 97-66095. Exhibition catalog.
 Schwabsky, Barry (1994). Porfirio DiDonna: Vision Fulfilled. Boston: Nielsen Gallery. LCCN 94-67814. Exhibition catalog.

Further reading
 Baker, John (December 1983). Porfirio DiDonna. “Arts Magazine”.
 Klein, Ellen Lee (February 1983). Porfirio DiDonna at Siegel Contemporary. Arts Magazine.
 Lloyd, Ann Wilson (December 1991). Porfirio DiDonna at Nielsen. “Art in America”.
 
  Review by Addison Parks of the DiDonna retrospective at the Danforth Museum, Framingham, Massachusetts, 8 September to 3 November 2013.

External links
 Nielsen Gallery page on Porfirio DiDonna. Retrieved 19 November 2013.

1942 births
1986 deaths
American artists
Artists from New York (state)
People from Brooklyn
Pratt Institute alumni
Columbia University School of the Arts alumni
Brooklyn College alumni